Outdoor Sportsman Group, Inc. (a.k.a. Outdoor Sportsman), a subsidiary of Kroenke Sports & Entertainment (KSE), is an outdoors media group in the United States. They publish 19 hunting, fishing and shooting magazines, and own the Sportsman & Outdoor Channels, and World Fishing Network specialty channels, as well as the MyOutdoorTV.com internet TV network, and 19.9% of the Canadian Sportsman Channel having purchased the Sportsman Channel from its founders in June 2007. In 2014, KSE acquired Outdoor Sportsman Group (then known as InterMedia Outdoor Holdings) from InterMedia Partners. InterMedia had acquired the magazines from Primedia in 2006.

In addition to traditional magazine publishing, Outdoor Sportsman Group is also involved with 11 top-rated TV series, syndicated radio, consumer events, and brand-driven merchandising businesses.

Publications
Bass Fan
Bowhunter
Firearms News
Florida Sportsman
Fly Fisherman
Game & Fish
Gun Dog
Guns & Ammo
Guns & Ammo: Handguns
In-Fisherman
North American Whitetail
Petersen's Bowhunting
Petersen's Hunting
Rifle Shooter
Shallow Water Angler
Shooting Times
Walleye In-Sider
Wildfowl

TV Networks
 Sportsman Channel (US & Canada (19.9%))
 Outdoor Channel
 World Fishing Network
 MyOutdoorTV.com (internet-based)

References

External links
 Sportsman Channel official web site  
 Outdoor Channel official web site
 Outdoors Sportsman Group official web site
 World Fishing Network official web site
 MyOutDoorTV official web site

Kroenke Sports & Entertainment
Magazine publishing companies of the United States
Cable network groups in the United States